Anton (Antal) Zilzer (1860, Budapest – November 16, 1921), was a Hungarian painter.

He was a pupil of Rauscher, Gregusz, and Székely at the national model school of design, and later studied at the Munich Academy under Raupp, Hackl, Seitz, and Herterich, completing his education at Berlin, Paris, and London.

He devoted himself especially to portraits, and received the Munich gold medal in 1887.

His paintings include:
 Alone in the Woods
 Ludwig II on His Funeral Bier
 Forest Idyls
 Sunset on the Lake of Constance

References 

1860 births
1921 deaths
Jewish painters
Hungarian Jews
Artists from Budapest
Academy of Fine Arts, Munich alumni
19th-century Hungarian painters
20th-century Hungarian painters
Hungarian male painters
19th-century Hungarian male artists
20th-century Hungarian male artists